Ólvega is a municipality located in the province of Soria, Castile and León, Spain. , the municipality had a population of 3,749 inhabitants.

Villages
Muro de Ólvega

References 

Municipalities in the Province of Soria